Damion Hyatt (born 23 December 1985) is a Jamaican international footballer who plays for Dunbeholden, as a goalkeeper.

Career
Hyatt has played club football for August Town, Arnett Gardens and Dunbeholden.

He made his international debut for Jamaica in 2018.

References

1985 births
Living people
Jamaican footballers
Jamaica international footballers
August Town F.C. players
Arnett Gardens F.C. players
Dunbeholden F.C. players
National Premier League players
Association football goalkeepers